Yves-Marie Vérove (22 October 1949 – 5 June 2022) was a French basketball player and coach.

Biography
Vérove was born and grew up in Grand-Fort-Philippe. In 1968, his local basketball team experienced great success, and he was signed by A.S. Berck Baskt, where he stayed from 1969 to 1975. With Berck, he won three French Basketball Championships before joining Caen Basket Calvados in 1976. In 1979, he moved to Limoges CSP, with whom he won the FIBA Korać Cup in 1982.

Vérove played in 32 games for the French national team from 1972 to 1976. He died in Brest on 5 June 2022 at the age of 72.

References

1949 births
2022 deaths
French men's basketball players
French basketball coaches
France national basketball team players
Sportspeople from Nord (French department)
Power forwards (basketball)
Berck Basket Club players
Caen Basket Calvados players
Limoges CSP players